American Guns was a reality television series that aired on the Discovery Channel. The series centers on the blended family where patriarch Rich Wyatt, his wife Renee, and his step-children run Gunsmoke Guns, located in Wheat Ridge, Colorado. They specialize in gun manufacture, trade, customization, and instruction.

On December 17, 2012, Discovery announced the cancellation of the series.

Staff

Wyatt Family 
 Rich Wyatt — Founder/Owner, Firearms Instructor
 Renee Wyatt — Co-Owner, Business Manager, Rich's wife
 Kurt — Engraver, Sales Associate, Firearms Instructor
 Paige — Sales Associate 

Rich and Renee have 2 younger children who are not involved in the show due to their age.

Gunsmiths & sales team 
 Brian Meidal – Head gunsmith
 Gary — Gunsmith/welder
 Joe — Machinist
 Jon — Gunsmith/painter
 Scott Van Dorsten — Gunsmith/custom rifle builder
 Bob — Gun historian
 Ben — Sales associate
 Chris — Machinist, sales associate
 Brian — Sales associate
 Doug - Machinist

Episodes

Season 1 (2011)

Season 2 (2012)

Reception 
The New York Times reviewed the show in the wake of the 2012 Aurora, Colorado shooting, examining the American fascination with firearms. They described the show as combining the "haggling of Pawn Stars, the over-the-top customizing of American Chopper and a healthy dose of cleavage in a peppy package that resembles a hundred other small-business-based reality shows, except that the business in this case is the sale of deadly weapons". The reviewer notes that although some may be uncomfortable with the easy availability of guns in America, the audience of over 1 million viewers does not seem to have any such qualms.

Ratings 
The season 2 premiere (April 26, 2012) drew strong ratings, up 50% on the season 1 premiere.

Cancellation and controversy 
On December 17, 2012, Discovery announced the cancellation of the series.  Discovery said the decision had been made earlier, it was only announced in December. A spokesperson said "Discovery Channel chose not to renew the series and has no plans to air repeats of the show." The Sandy Hook Elementary School shooting is thought to have played a part in the decision.

Additionally, in March 2013 Gunsmoke Guns was served a search warrant for the premises by the Internal Revenue Service as "part of an ongoing financial investigation" that had been underway for several years according to an agency spokesperson. This took place shortly after a reported February 27 burglary where twelve handguns and three rifles were stolen by thieves who broke in through the roof of the shop.

There was also speculation in the press that the IRS investigation was the result of Gunsmoke operator Rich Wyatt's remarks regarding pending Colorado legislation regarding gun purchase and ownership.

In the last episode of season one, a man identified later as Wylie Newton attempted to sell an antique Colt pistol that had been stolen from a museum in New Mexico. A fan of the show that was familiar with the robbery recognized the gun and alerted authorities.

On March 10, 2017 a federal jury convicted Rich Wyatt on ten felony counts related to conspiracy, fraud and tax evasion. The jury found that Wyatt had failed to report 1.1 million dollars to the IRS. Furthermore it was revealed Wyatt had negotiated a deal with Discovery Channel when in fact he never did have federal firearms license, though instead used a straw license through Triggers, a gun store in Castle Rock. Wyatt was sentenced to 78 months (6.5 years) in prison.

Music 
The opening theme music is “Tallahassee” performed by Swamp Cabbage.

See also 
 Sons of Guns
 Guntucky

References

External links 
 American Guns at Gurney Productions
 

2010s American reality television series
Discovery Channel original programming
Television shows set in Colorado
Wheat Ridge, Colorado
2011 American television series debuts
2012 American television series endings
English-language television shows
Television shows about weaponry